Brahman is a cattle station supplied with an airport near the eastern highlands of Madang Province, Papua New Guinea. It is located 500 km north of Port Moresby and is 128 meters above sea level.

The land around Brahman is diverse. The highest local point is 1,644 meters, 9 km west of Brahman. There are 12 people per square kilometer around Brahman. The area is surrounded by forest.

The climate is tropical. The average temperature was 22 °C. The warmest month is August, at 24 °C, and the coolest is February, at 19 °C. Average rainfall is 346.7 cm per year. The rainiest month is March, at 43.1 cm, and the least is August, at 15.5 cm.

See also
Brahman languages

Notes

References

Airports in Papua New Guinea